John Frederick Lambton, 5th Earl of Durham (7 October 1884 – 4 February 1970), briefly styled Viscount Lambton between 1928 and 1929, was a British peer. Through his sister Lilian, he was an uncle of future Prime Minister Sir Alec Douglas-Home. Lord Durham is best remembered for the donation of Penshaw Monument to the National Trust.

Biography
Durham was born on 7 October 1884, the son of Frederick Lambton, 4th Earl of Durham and his wife Beatrix Bulteel.

Durham was educated at Eton College.  He fought in the First World War as a captain in the 3rd/7th Battalion, Northumberland Fusiliers and was wounded.  He succeeded to the earldom and subsidiary titles on the death of his father on 31 January 1929.

Durham died on 4 February 1970, aged 85.

Marriages and children
Durham was married firstly on 12 November 1919 to Diana Mary Farquhar (born 19 July 1901,  died 28 August 1924).  They had two sons:

 John Roderick Geoffrey Francis Edward Lambton, Viscount Lambton (born 6 September 1920, died 4 February 1941), committed suicide by shooting himself.
 Antony Claud Frederick Lambton, 6th Earl of Durham (born 10 July 1922, died 30 December 2006)

After the death of his first wife, Durham was married secondly on 4 March 1931 to Hermione Bullough, daughter of Sir George Bullough, 1st Baronet.  They had one son:

 Hon John George Lambton (born 10 June 1932, died 21 August 2012)

References

External links

1884 births
1970 deaths
People educated at Eton College
Earls in the Peerage of the United Kingdom
John Lambton, 5th Earl of Durham